Dr. Phibes Rises Again is a 1972 British horror-dark comedy film, produced by Louis M. Heyward, directed by Robert Fuest, that stars Vincent Price and Robert Quarry. The film is a sequel to The Abominable Dr. Phibes (1971). After seeking vengeance on the doctors whom he blamed for his wife's death in the first film, Phibes returns to seek eternal life in Egypt, while he pursues a centuries-old man who holds the ancient secrets that Phibes needs.

Plot
Three years after the events the previous film, Dr. Anton Phibes emerges from suspended animation when the Moon enters into an alignment with the planets which last occurred 2,000 years ago. Phibes prepares to take Victoria's body to the River of Life in Egypt, which promises eternal life for him and Victoria. However, his ancient papyrus map to the river has been taken by Darius Biederbeck, a man who has lived for centuries through the regular use of a special elixir. After translating the papyrus, Biederbeck seeks the River of Life for himself and his lover Diana. Phibes and his silent assistant Vulnavia enter Biederbeck's house, kill his manservant, and reclaim the papyrus; they leave for Southampton to take a ship to Egypt. Biederbeck travels on the same ship with Diana and his assistant Ambrose. When Ambrose discovers Victoria's body stored in the hold, Phibes kills him. His body is stuffed in a giant bottle and thrown overboard. Inspector Trout discovers the corpse when the bottle washes ashore near Southampton. He and Superintendent Waverley question shipping agent Lombardo; upon hearing the descriptions of Vulnavia, an organ, and a clockwork band all being loaded aboard, they realize that Dr. Phibes is responsible.

Trout and Waverley pursue Phibes to Egypt, catching up to Biederbeck's archaeological party near the mountain housing the hidden temple. Phibes, having set up residence inside the temple, hides Victoria's body in a secret compartment of an empty sarcophagus. He also finds the silver key that opens the gates to the River of Life. Phibes begins killing Biederbeck's men one by one. Biederbeck's team breaks into the temple and takes the sarcophagus and the key. Phibes uses a giant screw press to crush the man guarding the sarcophagus and a giant fan to simulate a windstorm, muffling his screams. The sarcophagus is retrieved.

Biederbeck is unmoved by the murders and insists on continuing. He sends Diana and Hackett, the last remaining team member, back to England. Hackett is lured from his truck by Phibes' clockwork men impersonating British troops. When he returns to the truck, Diana is gone and he is sand-blasted to death. His truck crashes into Biederbeck's tent.

Realizing Phibes must have taken Diana, Biederbeck confronts him. Phibes demands the key in exchange for Diana's life, claiming that when the gate is opened the water will drain out of Diana's trap and flow through the gate. Unable to free her from Phibes' water trap, Biederbeck surrenders the key. Phibes unlocks the gate to the River of Life, boats Victoria's coffin through it, and summons Vulnavia to join them on the other side. Biederbeck returns to the gate as it closes, pleading through the bars for Phibes to take him along. Phibes ignores him. Diana attempts to comfort Biederbeck, but he rapidly ages and dies.

Cast

Production
Producer Heyward brought in Robert Blees to co-write the film.  He felt Blees' sense of humor would serve a Phibes script well.  According to Heyward, Blees and co-writer Robert Fuest, who also directed the movie, had frequent disagreements about the script, forcing Heyward to mediate. Heyward said of the two writers' conflicts: "They were two men with great senses of integrity, but one protecting director's viewpoint and the other protecting writer's viewpoint."

American International Pictures (AIP) was grooming Robert Quarry as Vincent Price's replacement. It was rumoured that the two actors did not get on well, but Heyward said he did not notice any rift between them on the set. Quarry subsequently said that the studio had told him privately that he would replace Price when Price's contract ran out. According to Quarry, AIP had become disenchanted with Price, whose salary continued to rise despite his films' disappointing box office performance. In addition, Price was not particularly interested in working with the studio. AIP's plans were revealed to Price at a publicity event in England, when a publicist asked him how he felt about being replaced by Quarry. Quarry went on to say that while there was tension between him and Price on the set, it did not affect the production of the film. On the contrary, Quarry characterized the experience as "extremely pleasant. Our sense of humor was the one bond that made working with him a pleasure."

Director Robert Fuest, production designer Brian Eatwell (creator of the film's noted art deco settings), and composer John Gale all remained from The Abominable Dr. Phibes team. Price, Peter Jeffrey, and John Cater reprised their roles from The Abominable Dr. Phibes. Hugh Griffith and Terry-Thomas also appeared in both films, but played different characters. Caroline Munro appeared in both movies as Victoria, Phibes' late wife, but in both films her role was limited to lying silently in a glass coffin. It was originally planned for Phibes to have a new assistant in the sequel, but the studio insisted that Vulnavia be retained, despite the fact that the character dies in the first Phibes film, and despite the unavailability of original Vulnavia actress Virginia North, who was pregnant at the time. Valli Kemp was cast as a replacement.

Although the film's budget was slightly higher than that of The Abominable Dr. Phibes, several elements of the original script had to be cut for budgetary reasons; for example, the pyramid was originally planned to have several levels of traps and be overrun with boiling oil at the end. The desert scenes were shot in Ibiza, Spain.

Release
The film's U.S. release was slightly edited, cutting a few seconds each from some of the murder scenes in order to remove the most gruesome parts and allow the film to be released with a PG rating.

AIP solicited scripts for a third Phibes film, but Heyward said the studio never found one suitable. Proposed titles included "Phibes Resurrectus", "The Brides of Dr. Phibes", and "The Seven Fates of Dr. Phibes".

Reception
Variety wrote that Vincent Price "delivers one of his priceless theatric performances" and that producer Louis M. Heyward had "lined up a first-rate crew of technical assistants". Gene Siskel of the Chicago Tribune gave the film one star, criticizing the "cheapness of the production" and the "unmotivated, mostly unimaginative" violence. Kevin Thomas of the Los Angeles Times wrote, "Those who enjoyed the campy horror of last year's Dr. Phibes are in for a keen disappointment" and called the script "astonishingly slapdash". Philip Strick of The Monthly Film Bulletin wrote, "It's refreshing to find a sequel that's better than its prototype. The return of the abominable Phibes, his pallor flushed with the success of his initial screen appearance, is accompanied both by a larger budget and, more to the point, by a greater display of confidence at all levels of the production".

At the film review aggregator website Rotten Tomatoes, 57% of 21 surveyed critics gave the film a positive review, with an average rating of 5.9/10. In Horror Movies of the 1970s, writer John Kenneth Muir described the film as "no better or worse than its predecessor". In The Penguin Encyclopaedia of Horror and the Supernatural Kim Newman wrote: "Dr Phibes Rises Again lacks the gleeful insanity of the first film, but is far more achieved".

Soundtrack
The film score by John Gale was released on Perseverance Records on 20 March 2003.

References

External links

 
 
 

1972 films
1970s comedy horror films
1970s fantasy films
1972 horror films
American International Pictures films
British black comedy films
British comedy horror films
British sequel films
Films directed by Robert Fuest
Films set in 1928
Films set in Egypt
Films set in London
Films shot at EMI-Elstree Studios
Films shot in Almería
Mad scientist films
1972 comedy films
1970s English-language films
1970s British films